Hinkins is a surname. Notable people with the surname include:

David Hinkins, American politician
Frank Hinkins (1852–1934), English writer, photographer and illustrator
John-Roger Hinkins (1934–2014), American writer and founder of the Movement of Spiritual Inner Awareness